is a 2003 compilation album by the Japanese punk band Balzac. It features re-recordings of songs from the band's first five studio albums: The Last Men on Earth (1995), Deep – Teenagers from Outer Space (1997), 13 Stairway – The Children of the Night (1998), Zennou-Naru Musuu-No Me Ha Shi Wo Yubi Sasu (2000), and Terrifying! Art of Dying – The Last Men on Earth II (2002). Beyond the Darkness was Balzac's first North American release.

Reception

Stewart Mason of AllMusic gave the album a score of four-and-a-half stars out of five, calling the choruses of the songs on the album "surprisingly catchy" and the album as a whole "a solidly entertaining overview of what they're [Balzac's] all about".

Track listing

DVD
"Beware of Darkness"
"Yami-No Mukou-No Subete-Wo"
"The Silence of Crows"
"Out of the Blue"
"Making of Beware of Darkness"

Personnel

Balzac
 Atsushi Nakagawa – lead guitar
 Akio Imai – bass guitar
 Hirosuke Nishiyama – lead vocals, art direction
 Takayuki Yasuda – drums, programming

Production
 Tetsuya Kotani – engineer
 Akihiko Takenaka – mastering
 Mikito Sakuhana – assistant
 Jerry Only – executive producer
 John Cafiero – liner notes, executive producer

References

Balzac (band) albums
2003 albums